Booyoolie may refer to:
 Hundred of Booyoolie, a cadastral division in the  Mid North  of  South Australia 
 Gladstone, South Australia, formerly known as the Government Town of Booyoolie
 District Council of Booyoolie a historic local government body associated with the hundred